The Battle of Maes Moydog was a battle that took place at the field of Moydog (also Meidiog) on 5 March 1295 during the revolt of Madog ap Llywelyn and others against English rule, near the modern-day town of Llanfair Caereinion in Powys, Wales.

The battle
Madog's opponent was the Earl of Warwick who, on hearing that Madog's army was camped in a valley close to his base at Welshpool, made a night march on 4 March and surrounded Madog's army. Madog had his spearmen formed into a square, and may have repelled an English cavalry charge, killing around 10 men at arms. However, Warwick's innovative deployment of archers and crossbows gave the English the upper hand. Madog’s men were routed and flew into headlong retreat across the swollen river Banwy, in which many drowned.

A primary source for the Battle is the Annals of Worcester :

Quinto die Martii Willelmus de Bello Campo comes Warewik commisit bellum cum Wallensibus in loco quod dicitur lingua eorum Meismeidoc ; et prostravit ex illis de nobilioribus septingentos viros præter submersos et letaliter vul neratos. Sed Madocus ap Lewelin eorum princeps cum dedecore vix evasit. 

Madoc ap Llwelyn their captain, however, he escaped with difficulty to their own disgrace."

A second, smaller engagement near a place that the English records call 'Thesseweit' - the location of which remains uncertain - resulted in the loss of Madog's supply train. English losses totalled around one hundred dead; Welsh losses were placed at seven hundred. The battle was a crucial step in breaking Welsh resistance in the revolt; Madog was run to ground and captured in late July 1295.

References

 Richard Morgan, 'Thesseweit', Montgomeryshire Collections Vol. 68, pp. 87–9 (1980).
 J. E. Morris, The Welsh Wars of Edward I (Oxford, 1901).
 J. G. Edwards “The Battle of Maes Madog and the Welsh Campaign of 1294-5.” The English Historical Review, vol. 39, no. 153, 1924, pp. 1–12.

External links
 http://www.coflein.gov.uk/en/site/403416/details/maes-moydog-maes-madog-battlesite-cefn-digoll-near-montgomery

Maes Moydog
1295 in Wales
History of Powys
Maes Moydog
Llanfair Caereinion